Black Point is a 2001 film directed by David Mackay and starring David Caruso as an innocent man caught up in a bad situation when criminals go looking for lost money. It is named after the American town of the same name. It was shot in Victoria, British Columbia, Canada.

Plot

Federal agents stake out Ketchikan, Alaska in an operation involving laundered money. Guns start blazing and some crooks are killed and some escape.  A bomb goes off when the Feds are looking over a yacht.

In Black Point, Washington, John Hawkins is getting drunk in a bar. Still drinking from a bottle, he drives home, playing chicken with a truck which narrowly avoids him and then runs into a tree. This leads to the sheriff and her chief deputy turning up at his log cabin with guns drawn in case of trouble though Lisa is an old friend of John’s. However this is next day and John has now sobered up. Lisa tells him he has two strikes against him and the next time he causes trouble he’ll be put away (under America’s Three Strikes law where a minor offense can lead to a long term of imprisonment). This leads to a contrite John jogging into town to the local docks where he passes a young couple who are moving into a riverside house they have rented.

He meets his friend Standing Bear who runs a fishing boat (and the Seahorse Cafe) who John has let down again in not turning up for work because of his binges. John is set to work and later delivers some fish in his banged up vehicle to the new couple. The husband is out and the wife is having trouble with a water leak, which John fixes. As they are beginning to get friendly, Gus and some friends turn up so John leaves. He  chucks away his booze stash when he gets home. Early next morning, he joins a hunting party with Standing Bear and some of his indigenous friends.

Malcolm rings Gus up. He’s the man behind the villains and is a nasty person. Gus tells him that the Feds just got some “dirty money” but he still has the clean money.. The gang leave in a motor launch. John is jogging again and rescues Natalie who has jumped into the water to drown herself. Taking her back to her place, he sees bruises on her body where Gus has beaten her up. Gus meanwhile kills his gang leader and gets the money back. John returns to his house late to meet Natalie there. They cook and eat a meal and talk about her husband Gus and things get more romantic and they end up in bed. Later she wanders into a nearby shack where John is sitting. All around are photos of a young girl. John reveals that it is his daughter Gabrielle, who was six when someone took her while out Christmas shopping two years ago. His wife later left him. After everyone else gave up on her, he is still looking for her. Natalie talks of them leaving together.

Later, Natalie phones John that Gus and his cronies have turned up while she is packing. He rushes to her house and finds one of Gus’s men shoving her about. He attacks him and the other men and while one is accidentally shot by his friend, she shoots the other with a gun she stole from John the night they slept together. She then knocks John out and tapes his hands together, planning to kill him in the woods. John manages to escape and she thinks he fell over a cliff. Back at her house she then injures herself and makes it look like John is the guilty party before phoning the sheriff. The law turns up, then Gus turns up and it turns out that over $20,000 of jewelry is missing. Natalie who is in a local clinic tells Gus that “the bag” which Eddie carried is gone. It had all the clean money in it. Natalie tells Lisa some lies, meanwhile Fred finds the gun belongs to Hawkins so she and he head to his cabin with other armed officers. Gus is informed that Hawkins is one of the men who took the money.

Gus and his cronies go to the café and give Standing Bear a good beating to get information about John. John finds the beaten up friend and takes him to the clinic and is arrested when he leaves. Gus and Natalie are taken for a ride to see Malcolm who is busy torturing three men, one of whom he knows tipped the Feds off about the “harbour drop” at the film’s start. Malcolm wants his three and a half million dollars of clean money back, or else. Gus hears that Hawkins has been arrested, which naturally shocks Natalie. John is saying nothing, and in return Natalie says he was not one of the people who robbed her. Lisa knows that she does not have the whole story as people are lying to her but with no other choice, she lets John go. He goes to see Bear who is recovering in the clinic and on leaving is met by two of Gus’s men who want to take him to meet Gus. He slaps them about some and before leaving tells them to tell Gus he’ll be at Flanagan’s at two o’clock.

At Flanagan’s he tells Gus he wants Natalie in exchange for the money, and that he’ll take him to the money. If anything happens to him though, a “fuck you” letter goes to the sheriff in an hour’s time. Gus stays with the car while two men follow him into the woods. He is having doubts over Natalie. In the woods, one of the men reaching for what he thinks is money puts his hand in a bear trap. John knocks the other out. Natalie now blames Malcolm, saying he set Gus up so he gets Natalie and the money. Gus sends Logan into the woods to kill John and heads off to Harbour Manor Inn to confront Malcolm. Logan fares badly and ends up in the hands of John, Bear and some Indian buddies. Malcolm’s tough guy image cuts no ice with Gus now and he shoots him and his two enforcers. Natalie escapes by car as Gus finds out too late that she is “playing him”.

John visits the Sea Vista Camp Grounds, closed for the winter and finds the bag of money there, then goes to the Inn where he finds the dead bodies and alerts Lisa by phone. Gus is tipped off by Fred who is paying him for tip offs about Gus, and Lisa finds the money gone. She goes to John’s cabin where Gus gets her and he is waiting when John arrives with the bag of money. But while Gus has a gun on him, John threatens to drop a lit lighter into the bag of money which is now soaked in petrol. He does and dives out of the window, taking a bullet as he did so. Gus shows him Natalie who is ready to be hanged, then he kicks the chair out from under her. The wounded John tackles him and they smash into a post which knocks down the cross beam Natalie is hung from. The wounded John is losing the fight against Gus when Natalie who has got free of the noose stabs him in the back, killing him. Lisa and Fred turn up, and Natalie decides to tell all. She goes to prison but John (now recovered) is going to wait for her. He decides to leave the area for a job interview in San Francisco.

Cast
 David Caruso as John Hawkins
 Susan Haskell as Natalie Travis
 Thomas Ian Griffith as Gus Travis
 Gordon Tootoosis as Standing Bear
 Miguel Sandoval as Malcolm
 Eileen Pedde as Lisa
 Alex Bruhanski as Fred Walker
 Travis Macdonald as Eddy
 Shawn Reis as Logan
 Mike Dopud as Ray
 Gus Lynch as Mike
 John Tench as Kevin
 Allee Friend as Gabrielle

References

External links
 https://www.imdb.com/title/tt0283942/
 

2001 films
2000s English-language films